Argonauta tokunagai is an extinct species of octopus. It was described in 1913 based on fossil material from the Middle Miocene Huzina Formation of Japan.

Undescribed fossil species of Argonauta related to this taxon have been temporarily designated Argonauta cf. tokunagai and Argonauta "tokunagai".

References

 Kobayashi, T. (1956). A palaeo-meteorological interpretation to the occurrence of the Argonautinae in Province Kaga, central Japan. Japanese Journal of Geology and Geography 27(2–4): 93–104.

tokunagai
Fossil taxa described in 1913
Extinct animals of Japan